Robin Chatterjee was an Indian music director. He has composed music for 52 films among which 39 are in Bengali, 12 in Hindi and 1 film was made in both Hindi and Bengali versions. He also composed background score for 22 films, all are Hindi. The following is a list of films he scored:

1940s

1950s

1960s

1970s

1980s

Background Scores Only

As lyricist

References

Sources
 

Discographies of Indian artists